Glattalbahn may refer to:

The Wallisellen–Uster–Rapperswil railway line in the Swiss canton of Zurich
The Stadtbahn Glattal, a more recent light rail system also in the Swiss canton of Zurich